Lygosoma boehmei is a species of skink, a lizard in the family Scincidae. The species is endemic to Vietnam.

Etymology
The specific name, boehmei, is in honor of German herpetologist Wolfgang Böhme.

Discovery
L. boehmei was discovered in Ke Bang National Park, central Quang Binh Province, Vietnam.

Habitat

Description
Dorsally, L. boehmei is reddish brown on the body, and brownish black on the limbs and tail. Ventrally, it is light orange on the chin and throat, cream to light brownish on the body, and grayish on the tail.

Behavior
L. boehmei is terrestrial and nocturnal.

Diet
The stomach of the holotype contained the remains of an earthworm.

Reproduction
The mode of reproduction of L. boehmei is unknown.

References

Further reading
Bobrov VV, Semenov DV (2008). [Lizards of Vietnam ]. Moscow: [KMK Scientific Press]. 236 pp. (Riopa boehmei, new combination). (in Russian).
Geissler P, Hartmann T, Neang T (2012). "A new species of the genus Lygosoma Hardwicke & Gray, 1827 (Squamata: Scincidae) from northeastern Cambodia, with an updated identification key to the genus Lygosoma in mainland Southeast Asia". Zootaxa 3190: 56–68.
Nguyen VS, Ho CT, Nguyen TQ (2009). Herpetofauna of Vietnam. Frankfurt am Main: Chimaira / Serpents Tale. 768 pp. .
Ziegler T, Schmitz A, Heidrich A, Vu NT, Nguyen TQ (2007). "A new species of Lygosoma (Squamata: Sauria: Scincidae) from the Central Truong Son, Vietnam, with notes on its molecular phylogenetic position". Revue suisse de Zoologie 114 (2): 397–415. (Lygosoma boehmei, new species).

Lygosoma
Endemic fauna of Vietnam
Reptiles of Vietnam
Reptiles described in 2007
Taxa named by Thomas Ziegler (zoologist)
Taxa named by Andreas Schmitz